Michael Grace Phipps (January 10, 1910 – March 13, 1973) was an American businessman, champion polo player, owner/breeder of racehorses, and a philanthropist.

Biography
Michael Phipps was the son of John Shaffer Phipps and Margarita Celia Grace, daughter of Michael P. Grace. He was a member of the Yale University intercollegiate championship team in both 1930 and 1932. He participated in the 1936 and 1939 International Polo Cup.  A member of the Meadowbrook Polo Club on Long Island, New York, in 1938 he was elevated to a Ten Goal ranking, the highest level achievable in polo. On March 17, 1994 he was posthumously elected to the Museum of Polo and Hall of Fame.

Education and business career
Michael Phipps studied at St. Bernard's School and St. Paul's School before going on to Yale University. Phipps became a successful investor and would serve as a vice president of his family's Bessemer Securities Corporation and sit on the board of directors of W. R. Grace and Company, a company owned by his maternal grandfather's family.

Thoroughbred racing
Several members of the Phipps family were involved in horse racing. Most notably from the same era as Michael Phipps was his brother Hubert, a cousin  Ogden, as well as his uncle Henry Carnegie Phipps whose wife was a partner in the renowned Wheatley Stable. On the death of his father, Michaell Phipps purchased his stable of horses from the Estate. Some of the successful Thoroughbreds owned and raced by Michael Phipps were Raja Baba and Gentleman James.

Michael Phipps served on the board of directors of Hialeah Park Race Track.

References

1910 births
1973 deaths
Yale University alumni
Businesspeople from New York (state)
American polo players
International Polo Cup
American racehorse owners and breeders
Philanthropists from New York (state)
Phipps family
Place of birth missing
People from Old Westbury, New York
People from Palm Beach, Florida
20th-century American businesspeople
St. Bernard's School alumni
20th-century American philanthropists